Teyssode (Languedocien: Teissòde) is a commune in the Tarn department in southern France.

Geography

Localisation 
Teyssode is located south-east of Lavaur, the main town nearby.

Neighbouring communes

Toponymy 
The name of Teyssode is of gallo-romance origin, from the word taxo meaning badger.

History 
Teyssode is located on a former Roman oppidum.

In 1824, Teyssode absorbed the neighbouring commune of Saint-Germier.

See also
Communes of the Tarn department

References

External links

Communes of Tarn (department)